= New Zealand national field hockey team =

New Zealand national field hockey team may refer to:

- New Zealand men's national field hockey team
- New Zealand women's national field hockey team
